Kendriya Vidyalaya Malleswaram is a school in Bangalore, India, and one of the schools under the group known as the Kendriya Vidyalayas, a system of central government schools under the Ministry of Human Resource Development (India). Kendriya Vidyalaya Malleshwaram is one among fourteen Kendriya Vidyalayas in Bangalore.

Background
Kendriya Vidyalaya, Malleswaram is located on the 18th cross, adjacent to Malleswaram bus terminus. In 1966, the school was established at the temporary accommodation at CET cell. In 1972, the first batch of class X appeared for the board exams. In 1980, first batch of class XII appeared for the board exams. In 2010, the commerce stream in class XI was started.
Committed to total quality education, KV Malleswaram with the strength of about 1800 students and 60 staf, the Vidyalaya has three sections from class I to XII, offering physics, chemistry, biology/computer science, maths/Hindi/Sanskrit in one section (science stream) and in one section (commerce stream) offering accountancy, business studies, economics as subjects in senior secondary section. 

The vidyalaya works in 2 shifts. The 1st shift begins at 7:00am–12:25pm with 3 sections per class and the 2nd shift begins at 12:30pm–6:00pm with 2 sections per class.
KV Malleswaram is one of the few chosen Kendriya Vidyalayas to have upgraded to "E-Classroom" and e-Learning teaching process with the implementation of Smart Boards in the classroom. The vidyalaya has set up "Atal Tinkering Laboratory" under the "Atal Innovation Mission" by the NITI ayog  government of India. The objective of this scheme is to foster curiosity, creativity and imagination in young minds; and inculcate skills such as design mindset, computational thinking, adaptive learning, physical computing etc.
The Vidyalaya encourages students to take part in various competitions which are conducted at school as well in regional and national levels. 
For CCA activities and house contests, the students are placed into four houses : KALIDAS (Green), VYAS (Yellow), MATANG (Red), BANABHAT (Blue). The names of the houses are of famous (in Sanskrit literature) Indian poet/ authors.

The Vidyalaya produces an annual class magazines and a school magazine.

See also 
List of Kendriya Vidyalayas

References

Educational institutions established in 1965
Kendriya Vidyalayas in Bangalore
1965 establishments in Mysore State
Kendriya Vidyalayas